Theologos Daridis (born ) is a Greek male volleyball player. He has been a member of the Greece men's national volleyball team. At club level he currently plays for Olympiacos.

References

External links
 profile at greekvolley.gr

1991 births
Living people
Greek men's volleyball players
Olympiacos S.C. players
Competitors at the 2018 Mediterranean Games
Mediterranean Games bronze medalists for Greece
Mediterranean Games medalists in volleyball
Volleyball players from Orestiada